Saint Francis School was a private Roman Catholic school located in Manoa, Honolulu, Hawaii, in the United States. It was founded in 1924 by the Sisters of Saint Francis of the Neumann Communities. It had an enrollment limited to just over 500 in grades PK through 12. The school closed in 2019.

History
The school started at Saint Francis Convent in 1924 to educate young women who joined the Franciscan Sisters.  It was founded in memory of Mother Marianne Cope, who came to Hawai‘i in 1883 with six other Franciscan Sisters of the Neumann Communities in answer to the call for aid of victims of this disease by King David Kalākaua.

In the fall of 2006, the school announced that it will be a co-ed school. The school became fully co-ed in school year 2012-2013.

In 2019, after the school's winter break, Saint Francis School was announced to close after the 2018-2019 school year.

References

Roman Catholic Diocese of Honolulu
Catholic secondary schools in Hawaii
Educational institutions established in 1924
Girls' schools in Hawaii
Private K-12 schools in Honolulu
1924 establishments in Hawaii
Defunct schools in Hawaii
Educational institutions disestablished in 2019
2019 disestablishments in Hawaii